Cyperus dregeanus is a species of sedge that is native to an area of southern Africa.

The species was first formally described by the botanist Carl Sigismund Kunth in 1837.

See also
 List of Cyperus species

References

dregeanus
Plants described in 1837
Taxa named by Carl Sigismund Kunth
Flora of South Africa
Flora of Namibia
Flora of Swaziland
Flora of Botswana